American Sportscopter, Inc., also called American Sportscopter International, Inc., was an American aircraft manufacturer based in Newport News, Virginia. The company specialized in the design and manufacture of helicopters in the form of the Ultrasport line of kits for amateur construction in the homebuilt aircraft and the US FAR 103 Ultralight Vehicles categories.

The company was formed before 1998 and seems to have gone out of business by 2010.

This was followed by a heavier and more capable single-seat design for the homebuilt category, the American Sportscopter Ultrasport 331. There was also a two-seat trainer, the American Sportscopter Ultrasport 496. All models were named for their empty weight, in pounds.

Aircraft

References

External links

Official website archives on Archive.org

Defunct aircraft manufacturers of the United States
Ultralight aircraft
Homebuilt aircraft
Helicopters